Siah Khani (also Romanized as Sīāh Khānī and Sīāhkhānī; also known as Sīāh Khūnī and Sīāmkhānī) is a village in Deylaman Rural District, Deylaman District, Siahkal County, Gilan Province, Iran. At the 2006 census, its population was 147, in 35 families.

References 

Populated places in Siahkal County